is a passenger railway station located in the city of Akashi, Hyōgo Prefecture, Japan, operated by the West Japan Railway Company (JR West).

Lines

Station layout
The station consists of one island platform. The station has a Midori no Madoguchi staffed ticket office.

Platforms

Adjacent stations

|-
!colspan=5|JR West

History
Asagiri Station opened on 20 June 1968. With the privatization of the Japan National Railways (JNR) on 1 April 1987, the station came under the aegis of the West Japan Railway Company.

Eleven people were killed and 247 injured in the Akashi pedestrian bridge accident that occurred on a pedestrian bridge leading to the station on 21 July 2001.

Station numbering was introduced in March 2018 with Asagiri being assigned station number JR-A72.

Passenger statistics
In fiscal 2019, the station was used by an average of 16,069 passengers daily

Surrounding area
 National Route 2
 National Route 28

See also
List of railway stations in Japan

References

External links

 JR West Station Official Site

Railway stations in Hyōgo Prefecture
Sanyō Main Line
Railway stations in Japan opened in 1968
Akashi, Hyōgo